Klong yao, called Khawng yao in Laos, is a long drum used in Thailand and Laos. It is generally slung over the shoulder and played with the hands. It has a wooden body and a drumhead made from water buffalo skin, and is usually decorated with a colorful skirt. It is played in many festival parades in Thailand. Extremely large klong yao, which may be up to 10 m in length, are sometimes encountered in parades, where they are carried by truck.

Similar drums are used by the Dai people of the Yunnan province of southwest China, as well as in Burma. It is the equivalent of the Cambodian skor chhaiyam.

See also
Traditional Thai musical instruments

Hand drums
Thai musical instruments